Ronald Peter Nash  (born 18 September 1946) is a British diplomat who served as Ambassador to Afghanistan from 2002 to 2003.  He was appointed Companion of the Order of St Michael and St George (CMG) in the 2004 New Year Honours.

References

Ambassadors of the United Kingdom to Afghanistan
Companions of the Order of St Michael and St George
1946 births
Living people